Sheira and Loli's Dittydoodle Works is an American half-hour weekly children's television series for preschoolers that aired in the mid-2000s. The series is produced by Rogar Studios, in association with WLIW in New York City.

Originating in a magical musical factory, rag doll twin sisters Sheira and Loli are the hosts in the world they share with their friends: resident visual artist Miss Molly, Doodles the wise-cracking talking purple crayon, eccentric but brilliant Professor named Professor Eeky Eeky Kronk, the troublemaking but good-natured yellow reptile-like creature named Zippy the Kwirk, and the childlike factory helpers, Professor Squeeky Squeeky Kronk (introduced in season 2) and two little furball characters known as the Funkins (Bluedles and Pink-a-Dink).

Celebrity guests for the first season include pianist/composer Marvin Hamlisch, who helps a discouraged Loli with her piano lessons in "Practice, Patience and Persistence" (episode #104), and R&B singer Chaka Khan as Mother Nature in "4 Leaf Clover" (episode #115). 

Sheira and Loli's Dittydoodle Works features music written and performed by the real-life inspiration for the series' main characters, twins Sheira and Loli Brayer. The sisters' performances on Sheira and Loli's Ditties for Little Kiddies-Volume #1, and Dittydoodle Works Celebrates the Holidays garnered two iParenting Media Awards. The show was approved by Common Sense Media.

The characters' diverse personalities are designed to provide opportunities to teach positive emotional, social, and educational lessons as young viewers learn, along with the characters, about self-esteem, cooperation, relationships, fitness, and concepts about nature, the physical world, and literacy.

Background
The characters were introduced to public television audiences on WLIW as a series of music video shorts, bumpers, and segments in between children's programs, which were nominated for a New York Emmy and received a New York State Broadcasters Award in 2001. The creative team includes veterans of some of the most notable and award-winning productions to come out of Broadway, dance, film, and public and cable television. The team includes Mark Saltzman, a former writer at Sesame Street for nearly a decade; Alan Adelman, lighting designer of numerous television and stage productions, including Alvin Ailey American Dance Theater, Great Performances, Live from Lincoln Center, and more; and Dean Gordon of the popular PBS children's series Between the Lions. Joseph Baker, one of Broadway's most sought-after composers and arrangers, oversees the series' music with Sheira Brayer and her identical twin sister, Leora Brayer. Baker has worked on such Broadway hits as Les Misérables, The Phantom of the Opera, and The Lion King.

Cast

 Sheira: Julie Smith (Season 1) / Brittany Moore (Season 2)
 Loli: Claudine O'Rourke (Season 1) / Elena Schloss (Season 2) 
 Professor Eeky Eeky Kronk: Steve Robbins
 Miss Molly: Janeece Freeman
 Bluedles: Brittany Moore (Season 1) / Whitney Crites (Season 2) 
 Pink-a-Dink: Heidi Mitrushi (née Hanson) (Season 1) / Tammy Paulino (Season 2)
 Professor Squeeky Squeeky Kronk: Kevin Steele (Season 2)
 Puppeteers: Eric Engelhardt (Season 1)
 Puppeteers: H.D. Quinn (Season 1)
 Puppeteers: Daniel Weissbrodt (Season 1, 2 + all online content)
 Vocals: Sheira & Leora "Loli" Brayer

Episode guide

Season 1

 Sheira’s Pen Pal
 Feelings and Communication
 Imagination
 Practice, Patience and Persistence
 Shrinky Shrinky Kronk
 My Froggy The Prince
 Make It Write
 You Are What You Eat
 Tis Better To Give
 Pilfered Piggy
 Moods
 Sick of Being Sick
 Better To Be Kind
 Senses
 4 Leaf Clover
 Together or Alone?
 Professor Pedro
 Froggy My Love
 Sportsmanship
 Who Switched the Switcher?
 Halfway Around the World to be with Friends
 Be What You Want To Be
 Peer Pressure
 Have No Fear
 Be My Own Kwirk
 Memories

Season 2

 Meet Squeeky
 Dear Diary
 Not Now
 No Lies
 Sacrifice
 Camping
 Make Room for Zimbot
 Procrastination
 Sharing
 Laughter Heels
 Pay Attention
 Where'd I Put It?
 Betty Rose
 Since You've Been Gone

Merchandise
Merchandise has been released for the show, including t-shirts, plush dolls of Sheira and Loli and The Funkins, tattoos, DVDs, CDs, paperback books, and activity books. Prior to the series start, in late 2000, when the duo was first featured on WLIW, a VHS was released based on all the music videos that were shown in between the children's programs.

References
Sheira and Loli's Dittydoodle Works Season 1 Episode Guide
Sheira and Loli's Dittydoodle Works Season 2 Episode Guide
Sheira & Loli's Dittydoodle Works: Summary, Description, Season 1's Episode Guide & Songs in each episode

2000s American children's television series
2005 American television series debuts
2009 American television series endings
2000s preschool education television series
American preschool education television series
American television shows featuring puppetry
Fictional dolls and dummies
PBS Kids shows
PBS original programming
Personal development television series
Television series about sisters
Television series about twins